Berma may refer to:
 Berma-ye Ashrostaq
 Berma-ye Zarem Rud